The Waldstadion, currently known as Raiffeisen Arena for sponsorship purposes, is a multi-use stadium in Pasching, Austria.  It is used for football matches and is the home ground of FC Juniors OÖ. Austrian Bundesliga club LASK Linz will use the stadium until their new stadium is complete in 2023. The stadium holds 7,870 and was built in 1990. In 2016, LASK purchased the VIP tent from SV Grödig and installed it in the stadium. In February 2017, the stadium was refurbished, with a new away sector and extra home seating, this was required for the stadium to reach Austrian Bundesliga standards.

TGW Logistics Group announced the stadium sponsorship in 2017. The company is a leading manufacturer and system integrator of automated intralogistics solutions with operations in Europe, North America and Asia. Headquarters are in Wels, Austria.

In mid-July 2019, Raiffeisen acquired the naming rights until LASK move out in 2022.

References

Football venues in Austria
Sports venues in Upper Austria
FC Juniors OÖ